Nucras taeniolata, the Albany sandveld lizard, striped sandveld lizard, or striped scrub lizard, is a wall lizard in the family of true lizards (Lacertidae). It is endemic to South Africa.

References 

Nucras
Lacertid lizards of Africa
Endemic reptiles of South Africa
Reptiles described in 1838
Taxa named by Andrew Smith (zoologist)